Nanga Entulang is a settlement in the Sri Aman District of Sarawak, Malaysia.  It is on the southeast bank of the Batang Lupar river, and includes the eponymous stream Sungai Entulang.

Neighbouring settlements include:

References

Populated places in Sarawak